Bogoslovska smotra  (Theologian's Review) is a Croatian interdisciplinary quinquennial scientific journal and among the oldest, still-publishing theology journals in the world, since 1910.

The periodical is referenced in WOS, ESCI, SCOPUS, EBSCO, ERIH PLUS, IBZ Online, Religious and Theological Abstracts.

History 
Founder and the first editor of the journal were Josip Pazman. The foundation of the journal was financially encouraged by archbishops Juraj Posilović and Antun Bauer, who established separate found for its financing. Bauer was a long-standing journal's benefactor. During the Interwar period bishops Ivan Šarić, Antun Akšamović and Josip Marušić were actively aiding publishing of the journal, that was widely distributed throuough the archdioceses of Zagreb, Ljubljana, Đakovo and Split, as well all the dioceses (from Senj to Subotica) of the state. Smotra was, along with the Glas Koncila, important promotor of the Second Vatican Council at the scientific and theologically-ecclesiastical scale.

In order to take scientific papers by Croatian theologian and philosophers beyond the Croatian-speaking area, the professors of the Catholic Faculty of Theology have been, since the early 2000s, striving to publish a part of this work in foreign languages. The Faculty Council decided in 2019 to add to the existing four printed issues, the fifth issue, as an electronic journal in foreign languages.

Notable editors were Tomislav Janko Šagi-Buntić, Adalbert Rebić, Tomislav Ivančić, Ivan Šaško..., as well as contributors Josip Weissgerber, Celestin Tomić, Bonaventura Duda, Kamilo Dočkal, Rudolf Vimer...

References 

Croatian-language journals
Religious studies journals
Philosophy journals
Multidisciplinary humanities journals
5 times per year journals